This article presents detail of the results in the 2003 Japan general election, breaking down results by block district. The 11 block districts elected 180 members by proportional representation (allocated to party lists in each block by the D'Hondt method), and 300 members were elected from single-member districts distributed among the 47 prefectures.

Five parties qualified to submit lists in each of the block districts. These were New Kōmeitō, the Democratic Party of Japan, the Japan Communist Party, the Liberal Democratic Party, and the Social Democratic Party. In addition, a number of candidates were elected in single-member districts who were independent or belonged to smaller parties. Some of these joined the major parties after the election—notably, the New Conservative Party was subsumed into the LDP.


In each table, the second column shows the number of the seats the party won in a single-member district, the third does that in proportional representation along with the number of votes and the percentage, and the fourth does the total numbers of the seats for the party.

Party names are abbreviated as follows:
 LDP - Liberal Democratic Party
 DPJ - Democratic Party of Japan
 NK - New Kōmeitō
 JCP - Japan Communist Party
 SDP - Social Democratic Party
 Conservative - New Conservative Party

National summary 

Hokkaidō Block

Tohoku Block

Kitakantō Block

Tokyo Block

Minamikantō Block

Hokurikushinetsu Block

Tōkai Block

Kinki Block

Chūgoku Block

Shikoku Block

Kyūshū Block

Sources
 Psephos
 Nikkei

2003 elections in Japan
General elections in Japan
Election results in Japan